Attorney General Ford may refer to:

Aaron D. Ford (born 1972), Attorney General of Nevada
Sam C. Ford (1882–1961), Attorney General of Montana
Tirey L. Ford (1857–1928), Attorney-General of California

See also
General Ford (disambiguation)